Lac Bénit is a lake in the Haute-Savoie department of France. It has a surface area of 4.1 ha.

Benit